Notograptus is a genus of marine fish in subclass Actinopterygii and order Perciformes. They are sometimes placed in a family of their own, Notograptidae, or may instead be included in the family Plesiopidae. Notograptus supposedly bears a relationship with Acanthoplesiops.

Notograptus contains these species:
Notograptus gregoryi Whitley, 1941 (Shark-tailed eel blenny)
Notograptus guttatus Günther, 1867 (Spotted eel blenny)

References

Further reading
 Mooi, R. D. "Notograptidae." FAO species identification guide for fishery purposes. The living marine resources of the western central Pacific 4 (1999).
 James C. Tyler, C. Lavett Smith "New Species of Blennioid Fish of the Family Notograptidae from Eastern Australia". Academy of Natural Sciences.

Acanthoclininae
Taxa named by Albert Günther